Sreten (Cyrillic script: Сретен) is a Serbian and Montenegrin masculine given name of Slavic origin. It may refer to:

Sreten Asanović (born 1931), writer
Sreten Jocić (born 1962), gangster
Sreten Lukić (born 1955), policeman
Sreten Mirković (born 1958), boxer
Sreten Ninković (born 1972), long distance runner
Sreten Sretenović (born 1985), footballer
Sreten Stanić (born 1984), footballer
Sreten Stojanović (1898–1960), sculptor
Sreten Žujović (1899–1976), politician

See also
Sretenović

Slavic masculine given names
Serbian masculine given names
Montenegrin masculine given names